Stephanie Marie Toscano DiDomenicantonio (born April 28, 1989), also known as Steffi D, is a Canadian singer and actress, who first rose to prominence as a fifth-place finalist on the fourth season of Canadian Idol.

Early life 

DiDomenicantonio was born in Longueuil, Quebec, Canada, but grew up in Ottawa, Ontario. She attended École secondaire publique De La Salle, but left to audition for Canadian Idol. Following her elimination, she returned to complete her final year of high school.  DiDomenicantonio is a graduate of the George Brown College theatre program.

Career

Canadian Idol 
In early 2006, while in high school, DiDomenicantonio auditioned for the fourth season of Canadian Idol. At her Ottawa audition, she received mixed-results: judges Sass Jordan and Zack Werner voted "no" whereas Jake Gold and Farley Flex voted "yes". During her time on the show, DiDomenicantonio became known for her unorthodox song choices and unique look that included a bow in her hair. As part of the show, she had the opportunity to be mentored by various music icons, such as Martina McBride. McBride, when speaking about DiDomenicantonio, said "She’s got star quality. I see big things for her future. I’m a big fan."

On August 22, 2006, DiDomenicantonio was eliminated in 5th place.

Performances and results

Television 

In 2022 DiDomenicantonio, alongside Anand Rajaraman, hosted the annual CAFTCAD (Canadian Alliance for Film and Television Costume Arts and Design) Awards.

Theatre 

Following her run on Canadian Idol, DiDomenicantonio has performed on stage across Canada and the United States. She made her stage debut in the first national tour of Spring Awakening, as Ilse.

In 2013, she was nominated for a Dora Award in the Outstanding Musical Theatre Performance by a Female category for her role of Cinderella in Toronto's Young People's Theatre production of Cinderella (a RATical retelling).

Since 2018, DiDomenicantonio has portrayed the role of Janice Moshers & others in the Canadian production of Come from Away.

In 2020, amidst the COVID-19 pandemic that necessitated the temporary closure of theatre productions, DiDomenicantonio and stage manager Lisa Humber co-hosted a web series entitled Check in from Away for Mirvish Productions.

Credits

Theatre

Film

Television

Web series

Discography

Cast recordings 
 Canadian Idol: Spotlights – Sony BMG (2006)

References

External links

 Steffi D bio on Canadian Idol website (archived)

1989 births
Living people
Actresses from Quebec
Canadian Idol participants
Canadian musical theatre actresses
Canadian people of Italian descent
People from Longueuil
Singers from Quebec
Canadian television actresses
21st-century Canadian women singers